Paul McAllister (June 30, 1875 – July 8, 1955), was an American film actor. He appeared in 37 films between 1913 and 1940.

He was born in Brooklyn, New York and died in Santa Monica, California.

Filmography

External links

1875 births
1955 deaths
American male film actors
20th-century American male actors
Male actors from New York City